The Heart, She Holler is an American horror comedy television series created by Vernon Chatman and John Lee for Cartoon Network's nighttime programming block Adult Swim. The series premiered on November 6, 2011 and ended on December 11, 2014, with a total of 28 episodes over the course of 3 seasons.

Plot
The series, described as "Southern Gothic drama" and "an inside-out blend of soap opera and politically incorrect surrealist comedy", is about the long-hidden and isolated son of the Heartshe dynasty (Patton Oswalt) returning to run the town and being locked in conflict with sisters Hurshe (Kristen Schaal and Amy Sedaris) and Hambrosia (Heather Lawless).

Characters

The Heartshe family 
 Hurlan Heartshe (Patton Oswalt) – Secret son of Hoss Heartshe, hidden away "since the minute he was born" in a cave, where he lived for 40 years without any human contact, nor ever seeing the light of day, until he is brought out to run the town of Heartshe Holler. Of his character, Oswalt said "I thought of Kaspar Hauser. That was my model – lethally nonjudgmental of the world to himself, that he trusts everything's going to be awesome." In season 3, Hurlan is killed by the townspeople.
 Hurshe Heartshe (Kristen Schaal – season 1; Amy Sedaris – season 2–3) – Psychotic, vindictive, oversexed sister to Hurlan and Hambrosia. Endlessly plotting to take over the town from Hurlan. It is established in Season 2 that Hurshe was actually married, but her husband is in jail; they had a son and a daughter but she did not bother naming them and keeps them in a secret compartment under her bed, echoing the childhood of their uncle Hurlan.
 Hambrosia Heartshe (Heather Lawless) – Hurlan's other sister, who possesses telekinetic and mind-reading powers. She is also trying to take over the town and/or kill her sister. Very religious and married to the town sheriff, she was "born without lady parts", although she carries on an affair with severed ectoplasmic hands.
 Sheriff (Joseph Sikora – season 1–2; Scott Adsit – season 3) – The corrupt, generally incompetent sheriff of Heartshe Holler, he is married to Hambrosia and in love with her sister Hurshe after seeing her hang herself.
 "Boss" Hoss Heartshe (Jonathan Hadary) – The leader, founder, and owner of the Town of Heartshe Holler who died at the beginning of the series after working tirelessly on his extensive video will in which he leaves Hurlan his fortune and full control of the Holler. He appears in every episode through this video will, which he uses to teach and guide Hurlan. He is resurrected in the last episode of the first season when his corpse and living will are posthumously sentenced to "re-death" in the electric chair, but is deceased again in the following seasons which take place in an alternate reality.
 "Meemaw" Virginia Dare (Judith Anna Roberts) The matriarch of Heartshe Holler, and the bearer of the curse of Heartshe, being unable to diethough Boss Hoss reveals at the end of Season 1 that the real secret curse is that she can die, through unspecified means, and if she does it will result in the destruction of Heartshe Holler. It is explained in Season 2 that most if not all of the bizarre incidents which occur in the Holler are due to Meemaw's psychic control, which she uses to play twisted games with the inhabitants of the town for her own amusement. For example, Hurshe's affair with her own sister's husband was largely encouraged by Meemaw's psychic influence. Hambrosia may have inherited her psychic powers from Meemaw, but it is unclear which of them is stronger. In the Season 2 finale, Meemaw's real name is first given as "Virginia Dare", and in Season 3 it is confirmed that she is the actual Virginia Dare, "the first white person born on this continent". Her birth so offended the gods of the indigenous peoples that she was cursed.

Townsfolk 
 "Doc" (Kevin Breznahan) – The town's doctor, formerly an auto mechanic. He's also quite a skilled plumber.
 The Reverend (Leo Fitzpatrick) – The immoral and cowardly religious leader of the town. Formerly a criminal named "Psycho Mike"
 Cutter (Michael Laurence) – A sleazy handyman who was Boss Hoss's right-hand man and enforcer.  He did the dirty work of reining in anyone who challenged Hoss's control of the town.  In his video will, Hoss says that over the years he came to think of Cutter as the son he never had – only to then bluntly denounce that Cutter is not of course his son, and therefore he doesn't need to give him any inheritance, leaving Cutter emotionally devastated. Cutter also occasionally has flashbacks about all of the victims he killed.
 Jacket (David Cross) – an overweight redneck who always wears shirts bearing the Confederate flag.  He runs the bar section of the town's combined bar/convenience store, along with his wife Direne.  Jacket and Direne first appear in Season 2.  By Season 3, he stars in his own local access TV talk show, Wake Up White People.
 Direne (Jennifer Regan) Jacket's wife, who runs the front convenience store section of the town's combined bar/convenience store.

Episodes

Series overview

Season 1 (2011)

Season 2 (2013)

Season 3 (2014)

References

External links 
 
 

2010s American surreal comedy television series
2011 American television series debuts
2014 American television series endings
Adult Swim original programming
English-language television shows
Gothic television shows
Southern United States in fiction
Television series about dysfunctional families
Television series by PFFR
Television series by Williams Street
Television shows set in the United States